The following is a list of hydroelectric power stations in Brazil with a nameplate capacity of at least 100 MW.

According to the Associação Brasileira de Distribuidores de Energia Elétrica (ABRADEE) there are 201 hydroelectric power stations in Brazil with a nameplate capacity of more than 30 MW; the total capacity of these power stations in 2015 was 84,703 MW. There are an additional 476 hydroelectric power stations with a nameplate capacity between 1 and 30 MW and 496 micro hydroelectric power stations with a nameplate capacity of less than 1 MW.

See also 

 List of power stations in Brazil
 List of dams and reservoirs in Brazil

References

External links 
 

 
Dams in Brazil
Brazil